There is no global consensus on recommended maximum intake (or ) of the drug alcohol (also known formally as ethanol). The guidelines provided by health agencies of governments are varied and are shown below.  These recommendations concerning maximum intake are distinct from any legal restrictions (e.g. driving after consuming alcohol) that may apply in those countries. The American Heart Association recommends that those who do not already consume alcoholic beverages should not start doing so because of the negative long-term effects of alcohol consumption.

Caveats

Risk factors
The recommended limits for daily or weekly consumption provided in the various countries' guidelines generally apply to the average healthy adult. However, many guidelines also set out numerous conditions under which alcohol intake should be further restricted or eliminated. They may stipulate that, among other things, people with liver, kidney, or other chronic disease, cancer risk factors, smaller body size, young or advanced age, those who have experienced issues with mental health, sleep disturbances, alcohol or drug dependency or who have a close family member who has, or who are taking medication that may interact with alcohol, or suffering or recovering from an illness or accident, are urged to consider, in consultation with their health professionals, a different level of alcohol use, including reduction or abstention.

Activities
Furthermore, the maximum amounts allowed do not apply to those involved with activities such as operating vehicles or machinery, risky sports or other activities, or those responsible for the safety of others.

Moreover, studies suggest even moderate alcohol consumption may significantly impair – neurobiologically beneficial and -demanding – exercise (possibly including the recovery and adaptation).

Daily consumption, habituation and addiction
As of 2022, moderate consumption levels of alcoholic beverages are typically defined in terms of average consumption per day. However, when drinking becomes a chronic daily activity the consumption puts individuals at an increased health risk as it may lead to habituation, desensitization (consumption-induced tolerance), progressively increasing average dosages and addiction.

According to the CDC, it would be important to focus on the amount people drink on the days that they drink. However, few studies or guidelines distinguish between or compare "moderate consumption" patterns (i.e. frequency, timing and dosage/intensity per session) of occasional drinking and daily drinking. One review showed that among drinkers (not limited to moderate consumption levels), daily drinking in comparison to non-daily drinking was associated with incidence of liver cirrhosis.

Harmful physiological effects
Emerging evidence suggests that "even drinking within the recommended limits may increase the overall risk of death from various causes, such as from several types of cancer". Better health outcomes among moderate drinkers that some studies reported may be due to the moderate alcohol consumption itself but they may also instead be caused by "other differences in behaviors or genetics between people who drink moderately and people who don't". According to the CDC, recent studies indicate moderate consumption may not have the protective health benefits. A systematic analysis found that "The level of alcohol consumption that minimised harm across health outcomes was zero (95% UI 0·0–0·8) standard drinks per week".

Units and standard drinks

Guidelines generally give recommended amounts measured in grams (g) of pure alcohol. The size of a standard drink varies widely, as does the recommended maximum number of drinks per day or week, among the various guidelines. The amounts listed are not meant as recommendations for how much alcohol a drink should contain, but rather to give a common reference that people can use for measuring their intake, though they may or may not correspond to a typical serving size in their country. Research in the UK has shown that including pictures of units and a statement of the drinking guidelines could help people understand the recommended limits better.

In North America, one standard drink corresponds to a typical 12 fl. oz. bottle of 5% Alcohol by Volume (ABV) beer, 5 fl. oz. of 12% ABV wine, or a 1.5 fl. oz. shot of 40% ABV liquor. Due to the different size of the US and Canadian ounce however, the actual amount of alcohol is slightly different. In Europe the most common standard drink size is 10g of pure alcohol, making a typical 330ml bottle of 4.8% ABV beer correspond to 1.2 drinks or a 500ml bottle 1.9 drinks; 100ml of 11% wine is 0.9 drinks, and a 40ml shot of 33% spirits equal 1.0 drink, while in countries that use 12g, those same servings are 1.0, 1.6, 0.7, and 0.9 drinks respectively. Studies have shown that most people find it difficult to understand and define exactly what a standard drink is, and consistently underestimate how much they drink.

The amount of pure alcohol is stated in the table in both grams and millilitres. The number of standard drinks contained in 500ml of beer of 5% ABV (a typical large drink of beer, similar to a US pint of 473ml) is stated for comparison.

The amount of alcohol in any drink is calculated by the formula:

For example, 0.35-litre glass of beer with ABV of 5.5% has 15.2 grams of pure alcohol. Pure alcohol has density of 789.24 g/L (at 20 °C).

Men
The standard drink size is given in brackets.

Daily maximum drinks (no weekly limits recommended)
Australia:4/day; 10/week (@10 g = 40 g/day, 100 g/week) (New guidelines were adopted in 2020.)
 Austria: 24 g
 Canada: 3 standard drinks per day.
 Czech Republic: 24 g
 Germany: 24 g/day
 Hong Kong: 2/day (20 g)
 Italy: 24g (12g for those over 65)
 Japan: 1–2 (@19.75 g = 19.75–39.5 g)
 Netherlands: 10g (0g recommended)
 Portugal: 37 g
 Spain: 3 (@10 g = 30 g) Also suggests a maximum of no more than twice this on any one occasion.
 Sweden: 20 g
 Switzerland: 3 (@10g =30g) for men and 2 (@10g =20g) for women

Therefore, these countries recommend limits for men in the range 20–40 g per day.

Daily/weekly maximum drinks
These countries recommend a weekly limit, but intake on a particular day may be higher than one-seventh of the weekly amount.
Canada:Based on a standard drink of 13.6g, no more than: 3 (40.8 g)/day most days, 15 (204 g)/week, or 4 (54.4 g) on any single occasion.
New Zealand:Based on a standard drink of 10g, to reduce long-term health risks, no more than: 3 (30 g)/day; 15 (150 g)/week. At least two alcohol-free days every week To reduce risk of injury per occasion: no more than 5 standard drinks (50 g) on any single occasion.
USA:           Up to 4 units/day (56 g/day)(2.4 fl. oz./day), not to exceed 14 units/week (196 g/week)(8.4 fl. oz./wk)

Therefore, these countries recommend limits for men in the range 27.2–32 g of ethanol per day and 168–210 g of ethanol per week.

Weekly maximum drinks
Denmark: Low risk of disease: Less than 168 g; high risk of disease: More than 252 g.
Finland: 15 units (@11 g = 165 g/week)
Ireland: 17 units (@10 g = 170 g/week)
 United Kingdom: 14 units (@8 g = 112 g/week)

Women who are neither pregnant nor breastfeeding
Women trying to become pregnant should look at the guidelines for pregnant women given in the next section.

Daily maximum drinks (no weekly limits recommended)
 Australia: 4/day; 10/week (@10 g = 40 g/day, 100 g/week) 
 Austria: 16 g
 Czech Republic:  16 g
 Germany: 12 g/day
 Hong Kong: 1/day (10 g)
 Italy: 12 g 
 Netherlands:10g (0g recommended)
 Portugal: 18.5 g
 Spain: 2 (@10 g = 20 g) Also suggests a maximum of no more than twice this on any one occasion.
 Sweden: 10 g
 Switzerland: 2 (@10–12 g = 20–24 g)

Therefore, these countries recommend limits for women in the range 10–30 g per day.

Daily/weekly maximum drinks
These countries recommend a weekly limit, but your intake on a particular day may be higher than one-seventh of the weekly amount.
 Canada:Based on a standard drink of 13.6g, no more than: 2 (27.2 g)/day most days, 10 (136 g)/week, or 3 (40.8 g) on any single occasion.
 New Zealand:Based on a standard drink of 10g, to reduce long-term health risks, no more than: 2 (20 g)/day; 10 (100 g)/week. At least two alcohol-free days per week To reduce risk of injury per occasion: no more than 4 standard drinks (40 g) on any single occasion
 USA:           1/day; 7/week (@14g = 14 g/day, 98 g/week)

Therefore, these countries recommend limits for women in the range 14–27.2 g per day and 98–140 g per week.

Weekly maximum drinks
Denmark: Low risk of disease: Less than 84 g; high risk of disease: More than 168 g.
Finland: 10 units (@11 g = 110 g/week)
Ireland: 14 units (@10 g = 140 g/week)
 United Kingdom: 14 units (@8 g = 112 g/week)

Pregnant women

Excessive drinking in pregnancy is the cause of fetal alcohol syndrome (BE: foetal alcohol syndrome), especially in the first eight to twelve weeks of pregnancy.  Therefore, pregnant women receive special advice.  It is not known whether there is a safe minimum amount of alcohol consumption, although low levels of drinking are not known to be harmful. As there may be some weeks between conception and confirmation of pregnancy, most countries recommend that women trying to become pregnant should follow the guidelines for pregnant women.
 Australia: Total abstinence during pregnancy and if planning a pregnancy 
 Canada: "Don't drink if you are pregnant or planning to become pregnant."
 France: Total abstinence
 Hong Kong: "Abstinence from alcohol during pregnancy is the safest choice."
 Iceland: Advise that pregnant women abstain from alcohol during pregnancy because no safe consumption level exists.
 Israel: Women should avoid consuming alcohol before and during pregnancy
 The Netherlands: Abstinence
 New Zealand: "Women who are pregnant or planning to become pregnant should avoid drinking alcohol."
 Norway: Abstinence
 UK: Previously, UK government advice was to avoid alcohol for first 3 months of pregnancy. NICE guidelines (2007) stated, "If you are pregnant or planning to become pregnant, you should try to avoid alcohol completely in the first 3 months of pregnancy because there may be an increased risk of miscarriage. If you choose to drink while you are pregnant, you should drink no more than 1 or 2 UK units of alcohol once or twice a week. There is uncertainty about how much alcohol is safe to drink in pregnancy, but at this low level there is no evidence of any harm to the unborn baby. You should not get drunk or binge drink (drinking more than 7.5 UK units of alcohol on a single occasion) while you are pregnant because this can harm your unborn baby." However the draft UK Health Department guidelines, released in January 2016 now advise to avoid alcohol altogether if pregnant or planning a pregnancy. 
 US: Total abstinence during pregnancy and while planning to become pregnant

In short, all countries listed above now recommend that women abstain from alcohol consumption if they are pregnant or likely to become pregnant.

Breastfeeding women
"Alcohol passes to the baby in small amounts in breast milk. The milk will smell different to the baby and may affect their feeding, sleeping or digestion. The best advice is to avoid drinking shortly before a baby's feed." "Alcohol inhibits a mother's let-down (the release of milk to the nipple). Studies have shown that babies take around 20% less milk if there's alcohol present, so they'll need to feed more often – although infants have been known to go on 'nursing strike', probably because of the altered taste of the milk." "There is little research evidence available about the effect that [alcohol in breast milk] has on the baby, although practitioners report that, even at relatively low levels of drinking, it may reduce the amount of milk available and cause irritability, poor feeding and sleep disturbance in the infant. Given these concerns, a prudent approach is advised."
Australia: Total abstinence advised
Hong Kong: "Avoid alcohol and alcoholic drinks."
Iceland: Total abstinence advised because no safe consumption level exists.
New Zealand: Abstinence recommended, especially in the first month of breastfeeding so that sound breastfeeding patterns can be established.
United Kingdom: Total abstinence advised by some, such as the Royal College of Midwives; others advise to limit alcohol to occasional use in small amounts not exceeding the recommended maximums for non-breastfeeding woman as this is known to cause harm, and that daily or binge drinking be avoided.

Minors
Countries have different recommendations concerning the administration of alcohol to minors by adults.
 United Kingdom: Children aged under 15 should never be given alcohol, even in small quantities. Children aged 15–17 should not be given alcohol on more than one day a week – and then only under supervision from carers or parents.

See also

Alcohol equivalence
Standard drink
Unit of alcohol

References
Explanatory notes

Citations

External links

 The Brilliant Breastfeeding Alcohol and Breastfeeding  page describes pros and cons of drinking alcohol while breastfeeding.
 Drinking Guidelines: General Population by Country IARD.org
 Drinking Guidelines: Pregnancy and Breastfeeding by Country IARD.org

Alcohol and health
Food safety